A bicycle parking station, or bicycle garage, is a building or structure designed for use as a bicycle parking facility. Such a facility can be as simple as a lockable bike cage or shed or as complex as a purpose-built multi-level building: the common purpose is that they provide secure bicycle parking. Bicycle parking stations also go by names such as bike stations, bicycle centers and cycle centers, among many others.

Bicycle parking stations can offer additional facilities such as bicycle repairs, and customer facilities such as showers or lockers. Some are staffed while others are not. Some require users to join as members while others are on a per use basis or completely free of charge. Some are based at railway stations to facilitate "bike and ride" multi-modal transport, while others are situated at the end of the commute and as such are located in town or city centres, universities, and workplaces. Advanced bicycle parking station provide protection from weather, thieves and vandalism not only for the vehicle but also for the helmets and other personal belongings. In order to use less floor space, they store the vehicles vertically, either in a kind of towers or under the floor in shafts. It is important that the access time is short, even if several users want to store or transfer their bicycles at the same time.

Operation
Bicycle parking stations are often operated by local governments or municipalities or they can be private businesses run by bike shops or non-profit bicycle advocacy organizations. Some are fully automated.

Types
There are several types of bicycle parking stations.
Most bicycle parking stations are non-automatic, and the user usually leaves their bike at bicycle parking racks in the facility. These facility are usually sheltered or indoor, but unsheltered outdoor facilities also exist.

Automatic bike parking stations exist in many forms, such as underground silos using automated storage and retrieval system.

Services
Bike stations may have several services connected to the facility.

Security
To prevent theft or vandalism, a bike station may have:
 on-site staff during the day
 a gate or door secured by key or by proximity card access.

Customer facilities
For the customer there may be additional services, such as:
 lockers, changing rooms,
 showers, bathrooms and toilets,
 drinking fountains,
 food and/or beverages, usually via vending machine
 information available, such as pamphlets/brochures for bicycle safety, maps and other literature,e.g. about cycling routes or nearby points of interest. Some may even provide classes, e.g. bike maintenance or local area knowledge.

Bike services 
Some bike stations (such as at many railway stations in the Netherlands) have staff who are able to carry out simple or complex repairs for a fee. This is very handy for commuters who can leave their bike there in the morning and pick it up fully repaired at the end of the day when on the way home. Regardless of whether repairs are available at a station or not, the station may also provide:
 parts and accessories for sale
 air pump for self-repair of flat tyres
 bicycle rental.

Pricing
The most common pricing scheme for bike stations are:
 a user pays service: the stations cost money to use, either through daily, weekly, monthly payments or through periodic memberships (though sometimes non-members can pay for daytime locker use).
 free-of-charge service: the bike stations are usually fully paid for by the local municipality, local regional government, or by the operating company (e.g. for bicycle parking stations located at railway stations)
 mixed system: some small charge may be required from the end-user (e.g. an administration charge) but the bulk of the operating costs are paid for by another entity.

Construction costs
 The King George Square Cycle Centre in Brisbane, Queensland opened in June 2008 and cost 7 million Australian dollars.  It has 33 showers, 420 lockers, and parking for 420 bicycles in two-level racks.
 The bike station at Utrecht Railway Station in the Netherlands was completed in 2019 for around €30 million and holds 12,500 bicycles, making it the world's largest. It has three levels of double-decker bike racks, connected by gentle sloping ramps.
 The RBWH Cycle Centre in Brisbane opened in November 2009 and cost A$8 million.  It has 40 showers, more than 900 lockers, and parking for 750 bicycles.
 The Parkiteer swipe card accessible bike cages of Victoria, Australia, which have at least 26 racks in them and cost approximately $AUD110,000 each.

Bicycle parking stations around the world

The following is a list of selected bicycle parking stations located in several countries around the world, often at train stations.
Australia
Melbourne, Victoria -  there are 60 Parkiteer bicycle cages spread throughout Melbourne's 216 suburban railway stations and a further 11 Parkiteer cages at regional V/Line stations across the state of Victoria. These cages are accessible via registered swipe card only and most have bike racks for 26 bicycles each, though some have additional capacity. 
Brisbane, Queensland: air conditioned facilities with showers, lockers, maintenance and dry cleaning services
cycle2city, located at King George Square busway station in the CBD (also known as the King George Square Cycle Centre), with 420 places
RBWH Cycle Centre, located at the Royal Brisbane and Women's Hospital in Herston with 750 places
Europe
Belgium
Ghent, Gent-Sint-Pieters railway station, under construction: two stations to host 17,000 bicycle parking spots in total.
Germany
Düren Fahrradparkhaus with 360 places
Münster, Radstation with 3,300 places, a new facility with 2,000 places on the other side of the railway station is under construction.
Netherlands
Amsterdam 
Fietsparkeergarage Prins Hendrikplantsoen with 7000 places under construction.
Fietsenstalling IJboulevard with 4000 places under construction.
Fietsparkeergarage Strawinskylaan with 3750 places.
Fietsenstalling Leidseplein with 2000 places.
Arnhem Fietsenstalling Station with 4500 places.
Delft 
Stationsstalling 1 with 5000 places.
Stationsstalling 2 with 2700 places.
Stationsstalling 3 with 2400 places.
Deventer Fietsenstalling Stationsplein with 3600 places.
Leeuwarden
Fietsenstalling station with around 3000 places.
Groningen
Stadsbalkon with around 5500 places.
Fietsenstalling station with around 5000 places under construction.
Leiden Lorentz with 4800 places.
Maastricht Fietsenstalling station with around 3000 places.
Nijmegen
Fietstransferium Doornroosje with 4000 places.
Fietsenstalling Station with 2600 places.
Rotterdam Centraal Station, with 5190 places.
The Hague Koningin Julianaplein with around 8000 places.
Tilburg 
Stationsstalling Noordzijde with 3900 places.
Stationsstalling Zuidzijde with 3400 places.
Utrecht 
Stationsplein, with 12,500 places it’s the world’s largest bicycle parking station and only one of about 20 stations with around 33,000 parking spots near Utrecht Central Railway Station.
Jaarbeursplein with 4200 places.
Knoop with 3200 places
Zwolle Fietsenstalling Stationsplein with 5475 places.
Spain
Blanes - Biceberg system at the bus station.
Huesca - Biceberg system on Av de Juan XXIII.
Vitoria - Biceberg system at Club Deportivo Mendizorrotza, Vitoria-Gasteiz.
Zaragoza - Biceberg system; one facility in Plaza San Pedro Nolasco, and a second facility in Calle Menéndez Pelayo.
United Kingdom
Greater Manchester - Transport for Greater Manchester has developed several Cycle Hubs.
Cambridge - The new station development contains around 3000 places.
North America 
Bikestation : Long Beach, Covina, Claremont, Santa Barbara, Palo Alto, CA, Washington DC, and Seattle WA. 
Chicago, Illinois - The McDonald's Cycle Center in Millennium Park.
St. Louis, Missouri - Located downtown at 10th & Locust.
Vancouver, BC - Bike parkades are located at some SkyTrain and West Coast Express stations.
South America
Mauá, a suburb southwest of São Paulo, Brazil at the Mauá railway station on Line 10 of the CPTM. video of the bike station on Streetfilms. This bicicletário (bike rack in Portuguese) is operated by ASCOBIKE, or Assoçiâo dos Condutores de Bicicletas.

See also 
 Cyclability

References

External links

Bicycle parking